The 30th Guam Legislature was a meeting of the Guam Legislature. It convened in Hagatna, Guam on January 5, 2009 and ended on January 3, 2011, during the 3rd and 4th years of Felix Camacho's 2nd Gubernatorial Term.

In the 2008 Guamanian legislative election, the Democratic Party of Guam won a majority of seats in the Guam Legislature.

Party Summary

Leadership

Legislative
 Speaker: Judith T.P. Won Pat
 Vice Speaker: Benjamin J.F. Cruz
 Legislative Secretary: Tina Rose Muña Barnes

Majority (Democratic)
 Majority Leader: Rory J. Respicio
 Assistant Majority Leader: Judith P. Guthertz, DPA
 Majority Whip: Thomas C. Ada

Minority (Republican)
 Minority Leader: Edward J.B. Calvo
 Assistant Minority Leader: Ray Tenorio
 Minority Whip: James V. Espaldon
 Assistant Minority Whip: Telo T. Taitague

Membership

On January 19, 2010, Democratic Senator Matt Rector resigned from office. Former Republican candidate, Vicente Anthony "Tony" Ada, was declared the winner of the special election held to fill the vacancy resulting from the Rector resignation. He was sworn-in as Senator on March 22, 2010.

Committees

References 

Legislature of Guam
Politics of Guam
Political organizations based in Guam